Thomas Percy Henry Touchet-Jesson, 23rd Baron Audley MBE (15 September 1913 – 3 July 1963) was born in Herefordshire, England, to Thomas Touchet Tuchet-Jesson and Annie Rosina Hammacott-Osler and educated at Lancing College. He married twice, initially to June Isabel de Trafford née Chaplin, daughter of Lt.-Col Reginald Chaplin, whom he divorced in 1957. His second marriage, on 26 April 1962, was to Sarah Churchill, daughter of former Prime Minister Sir Winston Churchill and his wife Clementine.

He inherited the title of 23rd Baron Audley on 27 May 1942 by writ, succeeding his second cousin Mary Thicknesse-Touchet, 22nd Baroness Audley on her death. As he died childless on 3 July 1963, the title passed to his sister Rosina (1911–1973).

References
 
 Biography

External links
 Touchet-Jesson genealogy

1913 births
1963 deaths
People educated at Lancing College
People from Herefordshire
Members of the Order of the British Empire
23
20th-century English nobility